Mikel Dunham  is an author, artist, photojournalist. and Himalayan historian. In the 1980s, Dunham worked in New York City where he created three-dimensional constructions of wood, glass, mirror, photographs and acrylic media. The Alexander F. Milliken Gallery, Inc. represented his work. mounting numerous solo exhibitions in Soho, as well as group installations in the US and abroad.

The late 80s Dunham became the last student of the late thangka master, Pema Wangyal of Dolpo. He spent the next four years learning how to mix mineral pigments, line-brush in 22-carat gold and paint Tibetan iconography. This led to Dunham's commission to paint the murals for a Tibetan monastery in Sarnath, India—one of eight major pilgrimage sites for Buddhists. Dunham then became artistic director for a much larger Tibetan mural project—a three-year commitment—in upstate New York at Pema Samye Ling Monastery.

In 2000, the Vajrakilaya Foundation selected Dunham to travel to Tibet and photograph Samye, Tibet's first monastery. Samye: A Pilgrimage to the Birthplace of Tibetan Buddhism (2004, Jodere Group), is the result of that assignment, a photography book interspersed with the history of Bon, the aboriginal religion of Tibet, and the three men most responsible for transforming Tibet into a tantric Buddhist nation: King Trisong Detsen, Padmasambhava and Shantarakshita. The foreword to Samye is written by the Dalai Lama.

Publications
In addition to Samye, Dunham has written two murder mysteries: Stilled Life, in 1989 and Casting for Murder, in 1992.

In 2005, Dunham published Buddha's Warriors: The Story of the CIA-Backed Tibetan Freedom Fighters, the Chinese Invasion, and the Ultimate Fall of Tibet. Buddha's Warriors is a political Tibetan history based on seven years of interviews with and the CIA Task Team who secretly trained the growing Tibetan resistance movement in the late 1950s and early 60s. (Foreword by H. H. the Dalai Lama.) Buddha's Warriors has been translated into French under the title Les Guerriers de Bouddha. The Japanese translation was published in 2007, the Indian/Pakistani edition came out in 2008, the Tibetan translation was published in 2009, the Czech translation was published in 2011, and the Chinese and Hungarian translations are currently under way.

In 2008, Le goût du Tibet was published in France, an anthology of articles about Tibetan culture, religion and political history. Other authors included in the book are the Dalai Lama, Sogyal Rinpoche, Pema Chodron, Henrich Harrier, Alexandra David-Neel, Milarepa and Antonin Artaud, among others.

In 2012, Caught in Nepal: Tibetan Refugees Photographing Tebetan Refugees by Vajra Publications (Nepal). Part photography book, part ruminations on the 2000-year-old relationship between Nepalis and Tibetans, this book was the result of Dunham having distributed digital cameras to Tibetan refugees stranded in Nepal and was funded by the William Hinman Foundation.

in 2015, The Nepal Scene: Chronicles of Elizabeth Hawley, 1988-2007 was published. Dunham was co-editor along with Lisa Choegyal, Nepal's New Zealand Honorary Consul. This political history is 2400 pages and published in a two-volume set by Vajra Publications, Kathmandu. Dunham wrote the postscript and was responsible for the book design and cover art.

Also in 2015, Dunham edited the English translation of The Autobiography of Rookmangud Katawal. He also wrote the Foreword.

Currently, Dunham is a correspondent for The Daily Beast.

Dunham has written articles for Harvard South Asian Journal, Tricycle Magazine, and a four-part report on child prostitute trafficking in Asia for Tehelka and interviewed by Radio Free Asia, Asia Times, Times of India, Indian Express, among many other magazines in Southeast Asia. Dunham plays an active role in human rights issues. He was selected as an international observer during the 2008 April elections in Nepal. Continual updates of the political situation in Nepal and Tibet are posted on his website.

Television and film
Dunham co-stars in the History Channel's TIBETAN BOOK OF THE DEAD (2007), Al Jazeera/English Television's THE TIBETAN REFUGEE CRISIS IN NEPAL (2008), the KefiWorks documentary THE CIA IN TIBET (theatrical release 2015), and THE DRAGON, a Spanish film on the Tibetan freedom fighters and the resultant refugee situation in Nepal, produced by Antropoduocus Produccions, Barcelona, Spain, and co-starring the Dalai Lama and Richard Gere. He is featured in Sophie Dia Pegrum's TALKING TO THE AIR: THE HORSES OF THE LAST FORBIDDEN KINGDOM (2014), which had its debut at the Kathmandu International Mountain Film Festival (KIMFF).

Bibliography
 
 
 
 
 
 Caught in Nepal: Tibetan Refugees Photographying Tibetan Refugees, Vajra Publications, 2012.

References

External links

 Mikel Dunham's blog

1948 births
21st-century American historians
American photographers
Historians of the Central Intelligence Agency
Tibetan Buddhism writers
Tibetan independence movement
American mystery writers
Novelists from New York (state)
Living people
American male novelists
American male non-fiction writers